To Be (做自己 Zuò zìjǐ, "be yourself") is a 1997 Mandarin-language pop album by Karen Mok. It was Mok's first album for the Taiwan and PRC markets. The album sold over 800,000 copies, and included a hit single, Ta Bu Ai Wo ("He does not love me").

Track listing
 Love Yourself
 Tā bù ài wǒ 他不愛我
 Xiǎng yīgè nánshēng 想一個男生
 Gēngyī shì (更衣室 changing room)
 Guǎngdǎo zhī liàn 廣島之戀
 Snacks
 Diàntái qínggē 電台情歌
 Wǔyè qián de shí fēnzhōng 午夜前的十分鐘
 Xìntú 信徒
 Love Yourself ràng wǒ měi 讓我美
 Zhǐyǒu bīngqílín de zhúguāng wǎncān 只有冰淇淋的燭光晚餐
 Chāi xìn 拆信
 Love Yourself ài zìjǐ 愛自己

References

1998 albums
Karen Mok albums
Cantonese-language albums